Dondapadu is a village in Eluru district of the Indian state of Andhra Pradesh. It is located in Pedavegi mandal of Eluru revenue division. It is located at a distance of 5 km from district headquarters Eluru city.

Demographics 

 Census of India, Dondapadu had a population of 1950. The total population constitute, 1011 males and 939 females a sex ratio of 929 females per 1000 males. 169 children are in the age group of 0–6 years, with child sex ratio of 878 girls per 1000 boys. The average literacy rate of the village stands at 90.68%.

References

External links

Villages in Eluru district